Lynchius simmonsi, also known as Simmons' big-headed frog, is a frog species in the family Strabomantidae. It is endemic to southern Ecuador where it is known from the type locality in the Cordillera del Cóndor, Morona-Santiago Province as well as from the adjacent Zamora-Chinchipe Province. Its natural habitat is subtropical old-growth forest. The type series was collected by day on the forest floor. The area was mined during the Cenepa War in 1995, and has consequently seen little human activity, although this may change through a proposed road.

Description
Lynchius simmonsi is a small frog; a subadult female measured  in snout–vent length. The head is longer than wide; the snout is short. The dorsum is reddish brown with dark brown marks; the skin is uniformly granular, with small, round, elevated, keratinized granules.

References

simmonsi
Amphibians of Ecuador
Amphibians of the Andes
Endemic fauna of Ecuador
Taxa named by John Douglas Lynch
Amphibians described in 1974
Taxonomy articles created by Polbot